Brigitte Giraud (born 1960, Sidi-Bel-Abbès in Algeria) is a French writer, author of novels and short stories.

Early life
Born in 1960, Brigitte Giraud grew up in Rillieux-la-Pape before settling in Lyon. She studied English, German and Arabic.

Career
Giraud worked as a bookseller, translator and journalist. For her first book La chambre des parents (1997), she received the "Prix Littéraire des Étudiants" and for Nico the "Prix Lettres frontière Rhône-Alpes".

On 3 November 2022, she was awarded the 2022 Prix Goncourt for Vivre vite, a récit about the death of her husband Claude in 1999 at the age of 41. She is the thirteenth woman to receive the Goncourt since the prize's establishment in 1903. Giraud won after the jury underwent fourteen rounds of voting, the maximum amount permitted. The final vote ended in stalemate and, in accordance with the rules, the president of the Goncourt Academy cast a deciding vote, selecting Giraud over Giuliano da Empoli's novel Le mage du Kremlin.

Personal life
Giraud lives in Lyon. Her husband, Claude, died in a motorbike accident in 1999.

Works

Novels and narratives (récits) 
1997: La Chambre des parents, Fayard
1999: Nico, Stock
2001: À présent, Stock
2004: Marée noire, Stock
2005: J'apprends, Stock
2009: Une année étrangère, Stock
2011: Pas d'inquiétude, Stock
2013: Avoir un corps, Stock
2015: Nous serons des héros, Stock
2017: Un loup pour l'homme, Flammarion
2019: , Flammarion
2022: , Flammarion (winner of the Prix Goncourt)
2022: Porté disparu, l'École des loisirs

Short stories

Collections  
2007: L'amour est très surestimé, Stock  -Goncourt de la nouvelle 2007 - Bourse Goncourt de la Nouvelle.
2010: Avec les garçons, followed by Le Garçon, J'ai lu,

Participation 
2004: One short story in Dix ans sous la Bleue, collective, Stock

Awards and honours 
 1997 – Prix Littéraire des Étudiants for La Chambre des parents
 2000 – Prix Lettres frontière Rhône-Alpes for Nico
 2007 – Prix Goncourt de la nouvelle for L'amour est très surestimé
 2009 – Prix du jury Jean-Giono for Une année étrangère
 2014 –  Officier of the Ordre des Arts et des Lettres
 2022 – Prix Goncourt for Vivre vite

Nominations
 2001 – Prix Femina (Selection) for À présent
 2001 – Prix du Livre Inter (Selection) for À présent
 2004 – Prix du Livre Inter (Selection) for Marée noire
 2009 – Prix Fémina (finalist) for Une année étrangère
 2011 – Prix Medicis (finalist) for Pas d'inquiétude
 2013 – Prix Femina (Selection) for Avoir un corps
 2015 – Prix Fémina (finalist) for Nous serons des héros
 2017 – Prix Goncourt des lycéens (finalist) for Un loup pour l'homme
 2017 – Prix Goncourt (Selection) for Un loup pour l'homme
 2017 – Prix Femina (Selection) for Un loup pour l'homme
 2017 – Prix Médicis (Selection) for Un loup pour l'homme
 2017 – Prix du style (Selection) for Un loup pour l'homme 
 2017 – Prix des Deux Magots (Selection) for Un loup pour l'homme

References

External links 
 Page on the website of her publisher
 Brigitte Giraud on Auterus en Rhône -Alpes
 Brigitte Giraud's blog
 Entretien avec Brigitte Giraud, directrice de la collection « la forêt » (Stock) 
 Brigitte Giraud on Confluences, rencontres littéraires
 Brigitte Giraud on Babelio

1960 births
Living people
20th-century French novelists
20th-century French women writers
21st-century French novelists
21st-century French women writers
French short story writers
French women novelists
French women short story writers
Officiers of the Ordre des Arts et des Lettres
People from Sidi Bel Abbès
Prix Goncourt winners
Prix Goncourt de la nouvelle recipients
Writers from Lyon